The Anselme Payen Award is an annual prize named in honor of Anselme Payen, the French scientist who discovered cellulose, and was a pioneer in the chemistry of both cellulose and lignin.

In 1838, he discovered that treating successively wood with nitric acid and an alkaline solution yielded a major insoluble residue that he called "cellulose", while dissolved incrustants were later called "lignin" by Frank Schulze. He was the first to attempt separation of wood into its component parts. After treating different woods with nitric acid he obtained a fibrous substance common to all which he also found in cotton and other plants. His analysis revealed the chemical formula of the substance to be C6H10O5. He reported the discovery and the first results of this classic work in 1838 in Comptes Rendus. The name "cellulose" was coined and introduced into the scientific literature next year, in 1839.

Anselme Payen Award RecipientsThe Anselme Payen Award, which includes a medal and an honorarium given by the American Chemical Society's Cellulose and Renewable Materials Division, to honor and encourage "outstanding professional contributions to the science and chemical technology of cellulose and its allied products".The Anselme Payen Award is an international award and any scientist conducting cellulose and cellulose related research is eligible for nomination. Selection of the awardee is based upon an evaluation of the nomination packages submitted on behalf of potential awardees. These documents are individually ranked by a panel of nine judges who are appointed by the current Chair-Elect and are unknown to each other. Three judges rotate off the panel each year. The identity of all members is known only to the Chair of the awards committee who compiles the results. After the awardee accepts, the Chair of the Awards Committee announces the winner at the next Spring ACS meeting. The awardee for that year is honored at the following Spring ACS meeting at a Symposium and Banquet. The award bears the year the winner was announced. It is presented the following year to allow time for organization of the Symposium and Banquet.

Recipients

References

Chemistry awards
American science and technology awards
Awards established in 1962